Naluchi is a neighborhood in Muzaffarabad, Azad Kashmir, Pakistan. The neighborhood is located on the western bank of Jhelum River with the Western Bypass Road to the north, and Abbotabad Highway to the west.

References

Muzaffarabad

ur:نالوچی